Chullkani (possibly a broken name from Aymara Chullunkhäni ("the one with the icicles"), Hispanicized spelling Chullcani) is a  volcano in the Cordillera Occidental in the Andes of Bolivia. It is located in the Oruro Department, Sajama Province, Turco Municipality. It lies near two lower peaks both named Wayna Chullunkhäni ("young Chullunkhäni").

Activity at Chullkani commenced in the upper Miocene with the cryptodome Ch'ankha Muqu. Later, southeast of Chullkani formed the rhyolitic Yapu Qullu lava dome. Chullkani proper formed 6.13± 0.12 Ma from andesites. Another group of five peaks stretching northeast are lava domes and named Jitiri, Picha Qullu (Picha Kkollu), Llallawi (Llalahui) (or Llallani), Jach'a K'uchu and Wila Lat'arata. A dacite lava dome named Liyun Ikiña was erupted 6.2±0.4 Ma.

During the Pliocene, fissure eruptions formed the trachytic Pérez Formation which crops out north of Chullkani. In the Wanq'u Jaqhi gorge (Huancoaki), these deposits crop out . Andesitic lavas erupted 2.3±0.2 Ma are named Wichhu Qullu lavas. Another effusive activity generated the Carbón Qullu lavas (Carbon Kollu) and finally the Pukara lava dome, whose collapse generated the Thuwas Ventilla pyroclastic flow.

References 

Volcanoes of Oruro Department
Miocene volcanoes